San Salvador is a department of El Salvador in the west central part of the country. The capital is San Salvador, which is also the national capital. The department has North of the Rio Lempa Valley, the "Valle de las Hamacas" (Hammock Valley) and a section of Lake Ilopango. Some of the department's cities that are densely populated are: San Salvador, Ciudad Delgado, Mejicanos, Soyapango, Panchimalco and Apopa. It was classified as a department on June 12, 1824. During the time of the colony, the department was the San Salvador Party, from where territory was taken to make the departments of Chalatenago, La Libertad, Cuscatlán and La Paz. This department produces beans, coffee, sugar cane, etc. for agriculture, on the other hand San Salvador Department holds many headquarters for banking companies in El Salvador and Central America, and for many communication services, also the headquarters of the electric companies are located in the San Salvador Department, last years these companies took a step and started exporting electricity to all Central America. The current mayor of the department is Ernesto Muyshondt (2015-2019)

Largest city: San Salvador
Smallest city: Rosario de Mora

Municipalities
 Aguilares
 Apopa
 Ayutuxtepeque
 Cuscatancingo
 Delgado
 El Paisnal
 Guazapa
 Ilopango
 Mejicanos
 Nejapa
 Panchimalco
 Rosario de Mora
 San Marcos
 San Martín
 San Salvador 
 Santiago Texacuangos
 Santo Tomás
 Soyapango
 Tonacatepeque

References

El Salvador at GeoHive

 
Departments of El Salvador
States and territories established in 1824